1896 in Argentine football saw Lomas's attempt to win its 4th successive Primera División championship, but the title was finally won by Lomas Academy, the other team from the club, which played its last tournament so it would be dissolved. Buenos Aires and Rosario Railway merged with Belgrano Athletic Club, which debuted that season.

Primera división

The championship took the format of a league of 5 teams, with each team playing the other twice.

Argentine Association Football League

References

 
Seasons in Argentine football
, Argentine
1896 in South American football